The Certified Wireless Security Professional (CWSP) is an advanced level certification that measures the ability to secure any wireless network. 

A wide range of security topics focusing on the 802.11 wireless LAN technology are covered in the coursework and exam, which is vendor neutral.

Certification track 
The CWSP certification is awarded to candidates who pass the CWSP exam and who also hold the CWNA certification. The CWNA certification is a prerequisite to earning the CWSP certification.

CWSP requirements 
This certification covers a wide range of security areas. These include detecting attacks, wireless analysis, policy, monitoring and solutions.

Recertification 
The CWSP certification is valid for three years. The certification may be renewed by retaking the CWSP exam or by advancing on to CWNE which is also valid for 3 years.

See also
Professional certification (Computer technology)

References

External links
 Official CWNP Site

Wireless networking
Professional titles and certifications
Information technology qualifications